Aviva Slesin is a documentary film-maker.

Slesin was awarded the Academy Award for Best Feature Documentary for her film The Ten Year Lunch: The Wit and Legend of the Algonquin Round Table in 1987. She is member of the Directors Guild of America and The Academy of Motion Picture Arts and Sciences. Slesin has been a MacDowell Fellow  and has had a retrospective of her work shown at the Sundance Film Festival She is a member of the faculty at NYU’s Tisch School of the Arts. Slesin is also a painter.

Career

Documentaries
Slesin's career was launched in 1975 as a freelance film editor with The Other Half of the Sky: A China Memoir, produced by Shirley MacLaine and nominated that year for an Academy Award for Best Feature Documentary. Next, she edited Making Television Dance about choreographer Twyla Tharp, followed in 1977 by The Rutles, a Beatles satire directed by Monty Python’s Eric Idle.

In 1980, Slesin made the transition to independent Producer/Director with nine comedy shorts for the original Saturday Night Live. In 1986, she directed and edited Directed by William Wyler, a biography of the late Hollywood director.

In 1987, Slesin won an Academy Award for Best Feature Documentary for her film The Ten Year Lunch: The Wit and Legend of the Algonquin Round Table. Then, 1990 marked a shift to dramatic films when Slesin directed and executive produced Stood Up! an ABC Afterschool Special. Then Slesin produced and directed Voices in Celebration, a documentary for the National Gallery’s fiftieth anniversary.  And in 1993 and 1994, she produced and directed the documentary, Hot on the Trail: Sex, Love and Romance in the Old West for TBS.

During 1995 to 1998, Slesin produced and directed a series of short segments for The Rosie O'Donnell Show, Kids Talk,  John Hockenberry's Edgewise, HBO’s Real Sex, and Religion & Ethics Newsweekly.

In 2003, Slesin produced, directed, and narrated Secret Lives: Hidden Children and Their Rescuers During WWII, which was nominated for two Emmys  and won a Christopher Award.

Films 
Directed by William Wyler (1986)
The Ten Year Lunch: The Wit and Legend of the Algonquin Round Table (1987)
Stood Up (1990)
Voices in Celebration (1980)
Hot on The Trial: Sex, Love and Romance in the Old West (1993)
Secret Lives: Hidden Children and Their Rescuers During WWII (2003)

Awards 
 Academy Award (Oscar)
 Inspirational Film Award, Hamptons International Film Festival
 Lilian Gish Award, Los Angeles Women in Film Festival
Christopher Award

See also
Documentary film

References

External links

Lithuanian film directors
Living people
New York University faculty
Directors of Best Documentary Feature Academy Award winners
Year of birth missing (living people)
Algonquin Round Table